Maniitsoq Ice Cap (old spelling: Manîtsoq,  or Sukkertoppen isflade) is a  ice cap in the Qeqqata municipality in western Greenland.

Geography 

There are no settlements in the vicinity of the ice cap. In the southeast, Maniitsoq ice cap is separated from the westward tongue of the Greenland ice sheet by the narrow Kangerlussuatsiaup Qingua valley.

In the south, several mountain glaciers drain it towards the upper reaches of the Kangerlussuatsiaq Fjord. To the west, the ice cap is drained by the long Sermitsiaq Glacier. To the northwest, numerous mountain glaciers drain it towards Kangerlussuaq Fjord. To the northeast of the ice sheet lies the wide highland of Angujaartorfiup Nunaa, home to herds of muskoxen, originally reintroduced in its northern part from the populations of the Northeast Greenland National Park.

See also
List of glaciers in Greenland

References

External links

Sukkertoppen, Greenland - Peakbagger

Ice caps of Greenland

ceb:Sukkertoppen Iskappe
sv:Sukkertoppen Iskappe